Monica Dogra is an American musician and actress. She has acted in six feature films, as well as released five studio albums with the band Shaa’ir and func. She is a member on the judging panel of India's first English music talent show, The Stage. She hosted four seasons of the music-Docu series The Dewarists that was nominated for a Cannes Lion.  She also worked on the Viceland Emmy nominated series Woman produced by Gloria Steinem.

Early life
Monica Dogra is the daughter of Dogra immigrants from Jammu, India. Her maternal uncle is Dogri folk music singer Prakash Sharma. She grew up in Baltimore, Maryland. She attended Oakleigh Elementary School, Montessori and Dulaney High School. She attended New York University, graduating with a bachelor's degree in musical theatre.

Career

In 2005, she formed the electronic rock group "Shaa'ir+Func", along with guitarist Randolph Correia. In 2007, they released their first album New Day: The Love Album, followed by Light Tribe in 2008 and Mantis in 2010. She also sang a song "Dooriyan Bhi Hai Zaroori" with Vishal Dadlani in the film Break Ke Baad and the theme song in English (with Shahid Mallya) for the film Inkaar.

She made her acting debut with a guest appearance in Rock On!!. In 2008, she was approached by Kiran Rao for the lead role in Rao's directorial debut film Dhobi Ghat - a role Dogra initially turned down, but eventually accepted. In December 2011, she served as a judge for Rolling Stone'''s Never Hide Sounds musical talent contest. She is the host of The Dewarists, a musical collaborative show on STAR World India. In 2013, she performed with award-winning violinist Scott Tixier, for a series of shows sponsored by Dos Equis around the US.

In March 2014, she was featured on the cover page of FHM Magazine. In March 2013 and May 2015, she was featured on the cover and had a pictorial in Maxim India Magazine.

She is now one of the judges for the show The Stage alongside Vishal Dadlani.

Monica Dogra will be next seen in her upcoming web series The Married Woman'', directed by Sahir Raza. The star cast also includes Ridhi Dogra in lead role.

Filmography

Web series

Music video appearances

Discography

Television

References

External links 

Monica Dogra on Instagram
Monica Dogra on Twitter
Monica Dogra on Facebook
Monica Dogra on YouTube
Shaa'ir and Func on Soundcloud

Year of birth missing (living people)
Living people
People from Olney, Maryland
Actresses from Baltimore
American film actresses
American television actresses
American women television personalities
American actresses of Indian descent
American women singers of Indian descent
Steinhardt School of Culture, Education, and Human Development alumni
Dogra people
Expatriate musicians in India
American expatriate actresses in India
Actresses in Hindi cinema
Fear Factor: Khatron Ke Khiladi participants
21st-century American singers
21st-century American women singers
21st-century American actresses